Karl Purgold (28 December 1850, in Gotha – 1939, in Gotha) was a German classical archaeologist and museum director.

In 1878 he received his doctorate from the University of Munich, where he was a student of Heinrich Brunn. Following graduation, he travelled the Mediterranean region by way of a grant from the German Archaeological Institute (1878–80). From 1890 until his retirement in 1934 he was director of the Herzogliches Museum Gotha (Ducal Museum in Gotha).

He took part in the excavations at Olympia, Greece, being tasked with providing analysis of ancient inscriptions. With Wilhelm Dittenberger, he edited Die inschriften von Olympia, based on the inscriptions found at Olympia.

Selected works 
 Archäologische Bemerkungen zu Claudian und Sidonius, 1878 – Archaeological observations on Claudian and Sidonius. 
 Die inschriften von Olympia, edited by W. Dittenberger and K. Purgold; (The inscriptions of Olympia), volume V. of Olympia : Die Ergebnisse der von dem Deutschen Reich veranstalteten Ausgrabung (Olympia : The results of the excavation organized by the German Reich; 1890–97). 
 Das Museum des Herzoglichen Hauses in Gotha, 1910.
 Das Herzogliche Museum, 1937 (with Eberhard Schenk zu Schweinsberg) – The Ducal Museum in Gotha.

References

External links
 

1850 births
1939 deaths
People from Gotha (town)
Ludwig Maximilian University of Munich alumni
Archaeologists from Thuringia
Directors of museums in Germany